Angelelmus (Angelelme, Angelaume) was bishop of Auxerre from 813 to 828. He was Bavarian, and became abbot of the monastery of SS Gervais and Protase, Auxerre.

He is a Catholic and Orthodox saint, with feast day on July 7.

Notes

External links
 Le Bienheureux Angelelme

828 deaths
Bishops in the Carolingian Empire
Bishops of Auxerre
German Benedictines
9th-century Christian saints
Year of birth unknown